The Syndicate is a British television drama series. It was written by Kay Mellor and is broadcast on BBC One. It sees five members of a betting syndicate win the lottery. Each series follows a different syndicate. The first series is set in a Leeds supermarket; the second, a public hospital in Bradford; the third, a crumbling stately home near Scarborough; and the fourth is set between a dog kennel in Yorkshire and Monaco.

The theme tune for the first two series of the show is "All or Nothing", by the Small Faces. For the third series, a cover version of the same song performed by Scars on 45 was used. The score is composed by guitarist Hal Lindes from Dire Straits. The theme tune for Season four of the show is a cover of "The Gambler" performed by David Nowakowski featuring Rising Fever. Series 4 premiered on BBC One on 30 March 2021.

The series was remade in America as Lucky 7 for ABC. However, it only ran for one series.

Cast
Lorraine Bruce as Denise Simpson is the only cast member to appear in every series, Series 1 in which she won the lottery and minor roles as a Lottery Winners Adviser in all subsequent series

Series 1
Timothy Spall as Bob Davies
Matthew Lewis as Jamie Bradley
Joanna Page as Leanne Powell
Matthew McNulty as Stuart Bradley
Amy Beth Hayes as Amy Cartwright
John Paul Hurley as DCI Newell
Katherine Dow Blyton as Annie Davies
Kai Owen as Gareth Powell
Anthony Lewis as Peter Davies
Clare Higgins as Joyce Bradley

Series 2
Siobhan Finneran as Mandy Atkinson
Alison Steadman as Rose Wilson
Mark Addy as Alan Walters
Natalie Gavin as Becky Atkinson
Jimi Mistry as Tom Bedford
Steven Waddington as Steve Atkinson
Roma Christensen as Reah Atkinson
Sally Rogers as Helen Dolan
Karl Davies as Luke Summers

Series 3
Elizabeth Berrington as Dawn Stevenson
Melanie Hill as Julie Travers
Lenny Henry as Godfrey Watson
Cara Theobold as Sarah Travers
Richard Rankin as Sean McGary/McAdams
Anthony Andrews as Lord Hazelwood
Alice Krige as Lady Hazelwood
Sam Phillips as Spencer Cavendish
Daisy Head as Amy Stevenson
Kieran O'Brien as Andy Stevenson
Polly Walker as DI Lynn Baker
Rob Kendrick as Nick Harrison
 Elaine C. Smith as Valerie Hardcastle
Poppy Lee Friar as Mary Campbell

Series 4
 Katherine Rose Morley as Keeley Sanderson
 Taj Atwal as Roxy Varma
 Liberty Hobbs as Gemma Hepworth
 Kieran Urquhart as Jake Thackery
 Kym Marsh as Donna Sanderson
 Ruben Reuter as Shane Sanderson
 Mark Benton as Graham Woods
 Emily Head as Colette Andrews
 Neil Morrissey as Frank Stevenson
 Gaynor Faye as Cheryl Armitage
 Rita May as Nanna
 Joe Sugg as Sam
 Katie McGlynn as Georgina Clarke

Episodes

Series overview
</onlyinclude>

Series 1 (2012)
In the first series the syndicate consists of workmates in a small local supermarket. It was written by Kay Mellor. Series 1 began on BBC One on 27 March 2012 and consisted of 5 episodes.

Series 2 (2013)
The second series aired in 2013 on BBC One. It revolves around another syndicate in a similar situation. It was written by Kay Mellor. The series looks at a syndicate involving workers at a public hospital in Bradford, Yorkshire. Series 2 began on BBC One on 19 March 2013 and consisted of 6 episodes.

Series 3 (2015)
BBC One renewed The Syndicate for a third series of six episodes, and the first episode was broadcast on 2 June 2015. This series was filmed in Yorkshire in 2014. The BBC announced the details of the third series of the programme on 21 October 2014. Actor/comedian Lenny Henry stars in the series, which chronicles the lottery win of a staff syndicate at a crumbling stately home.  Lynda Bellingham was due to play the role of a solicitor, in a role written especially for her by Kay Mellor, but she died shortly before filming commenced.

Series 4 (2021)
The fourth series began airing on 30 March on BBC One.

American adaptation
On 1 February 2013, it was announced that ABC had ordered a pilot for a US remake. It was renamed Lucky 7 and written by David Zabel and Jason Richman. Lucky 7 was cancelled on 4 October 2013 after only two episodes were broadcast, due to extremely low ratings.

References

External links 
 
 
 

2012 British television series debuts
2021 British television series endings
2010s British anthology television series
2020s British anthology television series
2010s British drama television series
2020s British drama television series
BBC television dramas
English-language television shows
Scarborough, North Yorkshire
Television shows set in Leeds